Malabar Hill Assembly constituency is one of the 288 Vidhan Sabha (Assembly) constituencies of Maharashtra state in Western India.

It is one of the five constituencies of Vidhan Sabha located in the Mumbai City district.

It is a part of the Bombay South (Lok Sabha constituency) along with five other assembly constituencies, viz Worli, Byculla, Shivadi, Mumbadevi and Colaba.

Members of Legislative Assembly

Election results

Assembly Elections 2019

Assembly Elections 2014

Assembly Elections 2009

References

Assembly constituencies of Mumbai
Assembly constituencies of Maharashtra